Mayne Group was an Australian healthcare and logistics company.

History
Mayne Nickless was founded in Melbourne in 1886 by John Mayne and Enoch Nickless as a parcel delivery service. Within three months it was operating 10 horse drawn vans, by the end of year it had 52.

Listed on the Australian Securities Exchange in 1926, it expanded to provide freight services to all Australian capital cities and ports. It also branched into armoured car cash deliveries and international logistics.

In 1975, it entered a joint venture with Trans Australia Airlines to form AAT Coachlines, this was sold in 1983. In 1979 it purchased cash handling company Loomis. In July 1982, Mayne Nickless took a 50% shareholding in Total West in partnership with Westrail. In 1985, Mayne Nickless sold its stake in Total West to Gascoyne Trading Company. In 1983, Mayne acquired a 50% shareholding in Ipec. It acquired the other 50% in 1988.

In 1992 Mayne Nickless took a 25% shareholding in telecommunications company Optus, this was sold in 2001.

After being found to have been part of a price fixing cartel along with Ansett and TNT in the early 1990s, it disposed of its remaining transport and security interests with Interlink and Ipec being sold to the Toll Group, Interlink Express to La Poste and Armaguard to Linfox.

In the 1990s, it diversified into healthcare purchasing hospitals and later pathology and diagnostic businesses. In 2001 pharmaceutical company F. H. Faulding & Co was purchased. In 2002, Mayne Nickless changed its name to Mayne Group.

In 2000, the container parks and warehousing facilities in Sydney, Melbourne and Brisbane were sold to Lang Corporation. In 2003, Mayne's 53 hospitals were sold to Affinity Health, a consortium of Citigroup, CVC Capital Partners and GIC Private Limited. In November 2005, the company was split into Mayne Pharma and Symbion Health. Mayne Pharma was taken over by Hospira in 2007 and Symbion Health was taken over by Primary Health Care in 2008.

References

Companies based in Melbourne
Companies formerly listed on the Australian Securities Exchange
Conglomerate companies of Australia
Logistics companies of Australia
1886 establishments in Australia
2005 disestablishments in Australia